The Dhaa (or Dhah) is a two-headed drum, "slightly smaller than the Dhimay." It belong to the membranophone group of Newar traditional musical instruments. It is a kind of drum specially played during the month of Gunlaa, the ninth month of Newar calendar. Dhaa is also known as "Gunlaa Baajan".

It is made of a hollow wooden trunk covered at both sides with animal skin. The left side is covered with a thicker skin producing flat sound whereas the right side is covered with thinner skin producing sharper sound.

The Dhaa is played by a group of even number of people standing. The instrument is suspended with a belt over the right shoulder. Dhaa is always accompanied with Taa and Bhushyaa along with the tunes from some aerophones.

References

Membranophones
Newar
Drums of Nepal